Cannabis is a film score by French singer-songwriter Serge Gainsbourg, released in May 1970 through Philips Records, accompanying the 1970 film of the same name, directed by Pierre Koralnik and starring Gainsbourg, Jane Birkin, and Curd Jürgens.

Conception

Background
After collaborating on Anna, a 1967 television movie starring Anna Karina, Gainsbourg and French director Pierre Koralnik decided to work on another movie which would eventually become Cannabis, when three producers (Roger Duchet, Andrée Debar, and Nat Wachsberger) commissioned one, based on seeing Gainsbourg and his then-lover Jane Birkin starring together in the 1969 film, Slogan, directed by Pierre Grimblat. All of the music for Cannabis was composed and written by Gainsbourg after the film had been shot, with help from arranger Jean-Claude Vannier, with whom Gainsbourg would again collaborate the following year on Histoire de Melody Nelson.

Recording
Cannabis was recorded at Studio Davout, a recording studio in Paris, France, with producers Roger Duchet and Nat Wachselberger.

Reception

Upon its release, Cannabis was received positively. Thom Jurek of Allmusic wrote that it was "among the most startling [...] in [Gainsbourg's] oeuvre", and also noted that the score was "one of the most sophisticated [...] Gainsbourg ever conceived".

Track listing
All music composed by Serge Gainsbourg and arranged by Jean-Claude Vannier.

Release history

References

External links
 Cannabis at Discogs

Serge Gainsbourg albums
1970 soundtrack albums
Philips Records soundtracks
Film scores
French-language soundtracks